Francis Eugene Low (October 27, 1921 – February 16, 2007) was an American theoretical physicist. He was an Institute Professor at MIT, and served as provost there from 1980 to 1985.
He was a member of the influential JASON Defense Advisory Group.

Biography

Early career
During the Second World War, Low worked on the Manhattan Project.  He was based at what is now the Oak Ridge National Laboratory, working on the mathematics of uranium enrichment. He later entered the United States Army and served in the 10th Mountain Division.

After the war, Low completed his studies at Columbia University, earning a Ph.D. in Physics in 1950. He then worked at the Institute for Advanced Study in Princeton, New Jersey, before taking up a faculty position at the University of Illinois.

Career at MIT
Low joined the MIT physics faculty in 1957. There his Ph.D. students included Alan Guth,  Mitchell Feigenbaum and Robert K. Logan.

He was a director of MIT's Center for Theoretical Physics and the Laboratory for Nuclear Science.

In 1969, Low helped found the Union of Concerned Scientists, and briefly served as its chairman. He stepped down after a disagreement with other members, who refused to consider studying whether nuclear reactors could be made safe and reliable.

In 1980, Low was appointed provost of MIT.  During his five-year tenure, he was instrumental in bringing the Whitehead Institute to MIT, and expanded humanities education at the Institute.

Low retired from MIT in 1991, but continued to teach for another few years. His text Classical Field Theory: Electromagnetism and Gravitation was published in 1997 by John Wiley & Sons.

Personal life
In 1948, Low married Natalie Sadigur. Low had a son Peter, two daughters, Julie and Margaret, and six grandsons; he liked to joke that this was statistically improbable. He became a widower in 2003.

See also
 MIT Physics Department

References

External links

 
 Francis E Low Foundation
 Francis E. Low Memorial Fund
 Francis E. Low: Coming of Age as a Physicist in Postwar America by David Kaiser. MIT Physics Annual. 2001
National Academy of Sciences Biographical Memoir

Massachusetts Institute of Technology provosts
MIT Center for Theoretical Physics faculty
1921 births
2007 deaths
Scientists from New York City
People from Belmont, Massachusetts
Harvard University alumni
Columbia Graduate School of Arts and Sciences alumni
Members of JASON (advisory group)
Manhattan Project people